The giant scops owl (Otus gurneyi), lesser eagle-owl or the Mindanao eagle-owl, is a species of owl in the family Strigidae. It is endemic to the Philippines. In size and structure, it is considered intermediate between a scops owl and an eagle-owl. Its natural habitat is tropical moist lowland forests. It is threatened by habitat loss.

Taxonomy
The giant scops owl was originally described as Pseudoptynx gurneyi, and later as Mimizuku gurneyi. it is now part of the genus Otus.

Description

It has a reddish-brown facial disc with a narrow black edge, white streaks above the eyes and prominent ear tufts. The back of the head and the upperparts of the body are reddish-brown boldly marked with black streaks and with a line of white streaks on the scapulars. The underparts are whitish with traces of reddish-brown and bold black markings. The voice is a series of five to ten calls, "wuaah, wuaah..." with the series repeated at ten to twenty second intervals.

Distribution and habitat
The giant scops owl is known only from the islands of Dinagat, Siargao and Mindanao in the Philippines. Although it has not yet been proven, it has been theorized that giant scops owls also exist on Marinduque, situated off the island of Luzon. It sometimes frequents partially logged forests of Dipterocarpaceae species.

Status and conservation
The giant scops owl is rated as "Vulnerable" by the IUCN in its Red List of Threatened Species. This is because the population is declining as its forest habitat is destroyed by deforestation and by the mining of chromite. This bird was never a common species and it is thought that in 1999 there were between 3,500 and 15,000 individuals remaining consisting of 2,500 to 9,999 mature individuals. Of the three islands on which it is found, Dinagat has been almost completely denuded of forest, while on Samar and Mindanao almost all the remaining forest is leased to mining or logging companies. The charity "Endangered Species International" is using this owl and other endangered species on a trail in the Mount Matutum protected area to teach local people and visitors to the Philippines about the importance of preserving the habitat.

References

External links

  Oriental Bird Images: Giant Scops Owl   Selected images

giant scops owl
Endemic birds of the Philippines
Birds of Mindanao
Fauna of Dinagat Islands
giant scops owl
giant scops owl
Taxonomy articles created by Polbot